The Thai–Myanmar Friendship Bridge is a bridge over the Moei river, which connects the city of Mae Sot in Tak Province in Thailand with the city of Myawaddy in Kayin State in Myanmar. The bridge forms an important link on Asian Highway 1 of Asian Highway Network.

History 

The Thai–Myanmar Friendship Bridge was opened on 15 August 1997. It was the first bridge between Thailand and Myanmar. On 15 August 2017, Thailand and Myanmar celebrated the 20th anniversary of the bridge's opening. The deputy governor of Tak province and Myawaddy governor attended the ceremony.

See also 

 List of bridges in Thailand

References

External links 

 Thai – Myanmar Friendship Bridge - Tourism Authority of Thailand

International bridges
Bridges in Thailand
Bridges in Myanmar
Myanmar–Thailand border crossings